Spondylurus powelli, the Anguilla Bank skink, was discovered in the Caribbean with 20 other reptile species and was immediately listed as an endangered species. The population of this lizard has been decreasing due to the introduction of the mongoose, which was originally imported to control rats in sugarcane fields, and now is an invasive species to the Caribbean Islands. Many of the newly added skink species discovered along with S. powelli are facing extinction for the same reason. Skinks are unique and perhaps at a disadvantage among lizards as they produce a human-like placenta and have live birth. The average gestation period is suggested at one year and may be the cause for the skinks being an easy target to the mongoose, since they are larger and slower when pregnant. Other types of human activity, along with the deforestation in the Caribbean, are thought to have decreased overall species numbers, as well.

References 

powelli
Reptiles described in 2012
Reptiles of the Caribbean
Endemic fauna of the Caribbean
Taxa named by Stephen Blair Hedges
Taxa named by Caitlin E. Conn